The Segunda División Profesional is the second division of professional football in Uruguay, established in 1942. The league is sometimes referred to as Primera B. In 1942, the Segunda División was established to replace the amateur Divisional Intermedia, establishing a professional league for lower divisions in Uruguay.

The most successful clubs are Fénix and Sud América with seven titles. The current champion is Racing.

Format 
After 1994, the competition was divided in two stages, called the Opening Championship (Torneo Apertura) and Closing Championship (Torneo Clausura), with a two-legged play-off between the best 4 teams in the aggregate table, not counting the champion and the runner-up who are promoted directly.

2023 season teams

List of champions

Tournament names:
 1942–1995: Primera B
 1996–present: Segunda División

Titles by club

See also
Campeonato Uruguayo de Fútbol
Uruguayan Primera División

References

External links

 
 El Ascenso.com, Portal

  
2
1942 establishments in Uruguay
Sports leagues established in 1942
Uru